The Little Maquoketa River Mounds State Preserve is an Iowa state owned archaeological site and natural area located within the city of Sageville, just north of Dubuque, on U.S. Highway 52.

It is high up on a limestone ridge above the Little Maquoketa River, not too far from the river's mouth with the Upper Mississippi River. The graves have been related to the Late Woodland culture, about AD 700-1200. Significant consultation went on with Native American tribes regarding the establishment of the preserve.

The land was purchased by the Iowa Department of Transportation in 1977, and in 1981, it became a state archaeological and geological preserve. By agreement with the state, the Dubuque County Conservation Board maintains and administers the area.

The remainder of the preserve functions as a park with a hiking trail, featuring mature forest and a segment of native blufftop prairie. As a part of the Driftless Area of Iowa, it has some geologically interesting areas, particularly the high limestone bluffs.

There is a parking lot. Access is year-round.

See also
Iowa archaeology
Mound
Mound builder (people)
Earthwork (archaeology)

Sources

Little Maquoketa River Mounds State Preserve, Iowa Department of Natural Resources, Retrieved July 20, 2007
Iowa State Preserves, Iowa Department of Natural Resources, Retrieved July 20, 2007
Dubuque County Conservation Board, Retrieved June 29, 2016

Mounds in Iowa
Native American history of Iowa
Protected areas of Dubuque County, Iowa
Iowa state preserves
Archaeological sites in Iowa
Protected areas established in 1981
Driftless Area
1981 establishments in Iowa